Utricularia erectiflora is a small, probably perennial, carnivorous plant that belongs to the genus Utricularia. It is native to Central and South America and can be found in Belize, Bolivia, Brazil, Colombia, Ecuador, Guyana, Nicaragua, Suriname, and Venezuela. U. erectiflora grows as a terrestrial plant in wet, sandy savannas, wet grasslands, or marshes. It was originally described and published by Augustin Saint-Hilaire, and Frédéric de Girard in 1838.

See also 
 List of Utricularia species

References 

Carnivorous plants of Central America
Carnivorous plants of South America
Flora of Belize
Flora of Bolivia
Flora of Brazil
Flora of Colombia
Flora of Ecuador
Flora of Guyana
Flora of Nicaragua
Flora of Suriname
Flora of Venezuela
erectiflora